The Katyusha is a type of rocket artillery first built and fielded by the Soviet Union in World War II. Multiple rocket launchers such as these deliver explosives to a target area more intensively than conventional artillery, but with lower accuracy and requiring a longer time to reload. They are fragile compared to artillery guns, but are cheap, easy to produce, and usable on almost any chassis. The Katyushas of World War II, the first self-propelled artillery mass-produced by the Soviet Union, were usually mounted on ordinary trucks. This mobility gave the Katyusha, and other self-propelled artillery, another advantage: being able to deliver a large blow all at once, and then move before being located and attacked with counter-battery fire.

Katyusha weapons of World War II included the BM-13 launcher, light BM-8, and heavy BM-31. Today, the nickname Katyusha is also applied to newer truck-mounted post-Soviet – in addition to non-Soviet – multiple-rocket launchers, notably the common BM-21 Grad and its derivatives.

Nickname 
Initially, concerns for secrecy kept the military designation of the Katyushas from being known by the soldiers who operated them. They were called by code names such as Kostikov guns, after A. Kostikov, the head of the RNII, the Reactive Scientific Research Institute, and finally classed as Guards Mortars. The name BM-13 was only allowed into secret documents in 1942, and remained classified until after the war.

Because they were marked with the letter K (for Voronezh Komintern Factory), Red Army troops adopted a nickname from Mikhail Isakovsky's popular wartime song, "Katyusha", about a girl longing for her absent beloved, who has gone away on military service. Katyusha is the Russian equivalent of Katie, an endearing diminutive form of the name Katherine. Yekaterina is given the diminutive Katya, which itself is then given the affectionate diminutive Katyusha.

German troops coined the nickname "Stalin's organ", after Soviet leader Joseph Stalin, comparing the visual resemblance of the launch array to a pipe organ, and the sound of the weapon's rocket motors, a distinctive howling sound which terrified the German troops, adding a psychological warfare aspect to their use. Weapons of this type are known by the same name in Denmark, Finland, France, Norway, the Netherlands and Belgium, Hungary, Spain and other Spanish-speaking countries as well as in Sweden.

The heavy BM-31 launcher was also referred to as Andryusha (Андрюша, an affectionate diminutive of "Andrew").

World War II 

Katyusha rocket launchers, which were built in Voronezh, were mounted on many platforms during World War II, including on trucks, artillery tractors, tanks, and armoured trains, as well as on naval and riverine vessels as assault support weapons. Soviet engineers also mounted single Katyusha rockets on lengths of railway track to serve in urban combat.

The design was relatively simple, consisting of racks of parallel rails on which rockets were mounted, with a folding frame to raise the rails to launch position. Each truck had 14 to 48 launchers.

The weapon is less accurate than conventional artillery guns, but is extremely effective in saturation bombardment. A battery of four BM-13 launchers could fire a salvo in 7–10 seconds that delivered 4.35 tons of high explosives over a  impact zone, making its power roughly equivalent to that of 72 conventional artillery guns.  With an efficient crew, the launchers could redeploy to a new location immediately after firing, denying the enemy the opportunity for counterbattery fire. Katyusha batteries were often massed in very large numbers to create a shock effect on enemy forces. The weapon's disadvantage was the long time it took to reload a launcher, in contrast to conventional guns which could sustain a continuous low rate of fire.

Development 

In June 1938, GDL's successor Reactive Scientific Research Institute (RNII) began building several prototype launchers for the modified 132 mm M-132 rockets. Firing over the sides of ZIS-5 trucks proved unstable, and V.N. Galkovskiy proposed mounting the launch rails longitudinally. In August 1939, the result was the BM-13 (BM stands for боевая машина (translit. boyevaya mashina), 'combat vehicle' for M-13 rockets).

The first large-scale testing of the rocket launchers took place at the end of 1938, when 233 rounds of various types were used. But the artillery branch was not fond of the Katyusha, because it took up to 50 minutes to load and fire 24 rounds, while a conventional howitzer could fire 95 to 150 rounds in the same time. Testing with various rockets was conducted through 1940, and the BM-13-16 with launch rails for sixteen rockets was authorized for production. Only forty launchers were built before Germany invaded the Soviet Union in June 1941.

After their success in the first month of the war, mass production was ordered and the development of other models proceeded. The Katyusha was inexpensive and could be manufactured in light industrial installations which did not have the heavy equipment to build conventional artillery gun barrels. By the end of 1942, 3,237 Katyusha launchers of all types had been built, and by the end of the war total production reached about 10,000.

The truck-mounted Katyushas were installed on ZIS-6 6×4 trucks, as well as the two-axle ZIS-5 and ZIS-5V. In 1941, a small number of BM-13 launchers were mounted on STZ-5 artillery tractors. A few were also tried on KV tank chassis as the KV-1K, but this was a needless waste of heavy armour. Starting in 1942, they were also mounted on various British, Canadian and U.S. Lend-Lease trucks, in which case they were sometimes referred to as BM-13S. The cross-country performance of the Studebaker US6 2½-ton 6×6 truck was so good that it became the GAU's standard mounting in 1943, designated BM-13N (normalizovanniy, 'standardized'), and more than 1,800 of this model were manufactured by the end of World War II. After World War II, BM-13s were based on Soviet-built ZIS-151 trucks.

The 82 mm BM-8 was approved in August 1941, and deployed as the BM-8-36 on truck beds and BM-8-24 on T-40 and T-60 light tank chassis. Later these were also installed on GAZ-67 jeeps as the BM-8-8, and on the larger Studebaker trucks as the BM-8-48. In 1942, the team of scientists Leonid Shvarts, Moisei Komissarchik and engineer Yakov Shor received the Stalin prize for the development of the BM-8-48.

Based on the M-13, the M-30 rocket was developed in 1942. Its bulbous warhead required it to be fired from a grounded frame, called the M-30 (single frame, four round; later double frame, 8 round), instead of a launch rail mounted on a truck. In 1944 it became the basis for the BM-31-12 truck-mounted launcher.

A battery of BM-13-16 launchers included four firing vehicles, two reload trucks and two technical support trucks, with each firing vehicle having a crew of six. Reloading was executed in 3–4 minutes, although the standard procedure was to switch to a new position some 10 km away due to the ease with which the battery could be identified by the enemy. Three batteries were combined into a division (company), and three divisions into a separate mine-firing regiment of rocket artillery.

Variants 
Soviet World War II rocket systems were named according to the following templates:
 BM-x-y (names used for ground vehicles)
 M-x-y (names used for towed trailers and sledges)
 y-M-x (names used for navy)

where:
 x is a model of a missile.
 y is a number of launch rails/tubes.

In particular, BM-8-16 is a vehicle which fires M-8 missiles and has 16 rails. BM-31-12 is a vehicle which fires M-31 missiles and has 12 launch tubes. Short names such as BM-8 or BM-13 were used too. Number of launch rails/tubes is absent here. Such names describe launchers only no matter what vehicle they are mounted on. In particular BM-8-24 had a number of variants: vehicle mounted (ZIS-5 truck), tank mounted (T-40) and tractor mounted (STZ-3). All of them had the same name: BM-8-24. Other launchers had a number of variants mounted on different vehicles too. Typical set of vehicles for soviet missile systems is the following:
 ZIS-5 (truck),
 ZIS-6 (truck),
 GAZ-AA (truck),
 STZ-5 (tractor),
 T-40 (tank),
 Studebaker US6 (truck),
 Armored train car,
 River boat,
 Towed sledge,
 Towed trailer,
 Backpack (portable variant, so called "mountain Katyusha"),
 ZIS-151 (truck, used after the war);

Note: There was also an experimental KV-1K – Katyusha mounted on KV-1 tank which was not taken in service.

A list of some implementations of the Katyusha follows:

Rocket variants 

Rockets used in the above implementations were:

The M-8 and M-13 rocket could also be fitted with smoke warheads, although this was not common.

Foreign variants 

The Axis powers had captured Katyushas during the war. Germany considered producing a local copy, but instead created the 8 cm Raketen-Vielfachwerfer, which was based on the Katyusha.

Romania had started developing its Mareșal tank destroyer in late 1942. One of the first experimental models was equipped with a Katyusha rocket launcher and tested in the summer of 1943. The project was not continued.

Combat history 

The multiple rocket launchers were top secret in the beginning of World War II. A special unit of the NKVD troops was raised to operate them. On July 14, 1941, an experimental artillery battery of seven launchers was first used in battle at Rudnya in Smolensk Oblast of Russia, under the command of Captain Ivan Flyorov, destroying a concentration of German troops with tanks, armored vehicles and trucks at the marketplace, causing massive German Army casualties and its retreat from the town in panic, see also in articles by a Russian military historian Andrey Sapronov, an eyewitness of the maiden launches. Following the success, the Red Army organized new Guards mortar batteries for the support of infantry divisions. A battery's complement was standardized at four launchers. They remained under NKVD control until German Nebelwerfer rocket launchers became common later in the war.

On August 8, 1941, Stalin ordered the formation of eight special Guards mortar regiments under the direct control of the Reserve of the Supreme High Command (RVGK).  Each regiment comprised three battalions of three batteries, totalling 36 BM-13 or BM-8 launchers.  Independent Guards mortar battalions were also formed, comprising 12 launchers in three batteries of four.  By the end of 1941, there were eight regiments, 35 independent battalions, and two independent batteries in service, fielding a total of 554 launchers.

In June 1942 heavy Guards mortar battalions were formed around the new M-30 static rocket launch frames, consisting of 96 launchers in three batteries. In July, a battalion of BM-13s was added to the establishment of a tank corps. In 1944, the BM-31 was used in motorized heavy Guards mortar battalions of 48 launchers. In 1943, Guards mortar brigades, and later divisions, were formed equipped with static launchers.

By the end of 1942, 57 regiments were in service—together with the smaller independent battalions, this was the equivalent of 216 batteries: 21% BM-8 light launchers, 56% BM-13, and 23% M-30 heavy launchers. By the end of the war, the equivalent of 518 batteries were in service.

Post-war development 

The success and economy of multiple rocket launchers (MRL) have led them to continue to be developed. In the years following WWII, the BM-13 was replaced by the 140 mm BM-14 and the BM-31 was replaced by the 240 mm BM-24. During the Cold War, the Soviet Union fielded several models of Katyusha-like MRL, notably the BM-21 Grad launchers somewhat inspired by the earlier weapon, and the larger BM-27 Uragan. Advances in artillery munitions have been applied to some Katyusha-type multiple launch rocket systems, including bomblet submunitions, remotely deployed land mines, and chemical warheads.

With the breakup of the Soviet Union, Russia inherited most of its military arsenal including its large complement of MRLs. In recent history, they have been used by the Russian Armed Forces during the First and Second Chechen Wars and by the Armenian and Azerbaijani Armed Forces during the First Nagorno-Karabakh War. The Georgian Defense Forces are reported to have used BM-21 Grad or similar rocket artillery in fighting in the 2008 South Ossetia war.

Katyusha-like launchers were exported to Afghanistan, Angola, Czechoslovakia, Khmer Republic, Egypt, East Germany, Hungary, Iran, Iraq, Mongolia, North Korea, Poland, Syria, Yemen and Vietnam.  They were also built in Czechoslovakia, the People's Republic of China, North Korea, and Iran.

Proper Katyushas (BM-13s) also saw action in the Korean War, used by the Chinese People's Volunteer Army and Korean People's Army against the South Korean and United Nations forces. Soviet BM-13s were known to have been imported to China before the Sino-Soviet split and were operational in the People's Liberation Army. The Viet Minh deployed them against the French Far East Expeditionary Corps during the Battle of Dien Bien Phu at the end of the First Indochina War. 

Israel captured BM-24 MRLs during the Six-Day War (1967), used them in two battalions during the Yom Kippur War (1973) and the 1982 Lebanon War, and later developed the MAR-240 launcher for the same rockets, based on a Sherman tank chassis.

The rockets were employed by the Tanzania People's Defence Force in the Uganda-Tanzania War. Tanzanian forces called them Baba Mtakatifu (Kiswahili for "Holy Father") while the Ugandans called them Saba Saba.

During the 2006 Lebanon War, Hezbollah fired between 3,970 and 4,228 rockets, from light truck-mounts and single-rail man-portable launchers. About 95% of these were 122 mm (4.8 in) Syrian-manufactured M-21OF type artillery rockets which carried warheads up to 30 kg (66 lb) and had a range of 20 km, perhaps up to 30 km (19 mi). Most rockets fired at Israel by Hamas from the Gaza Strip are of the simpler Qassam rocket type, but Hamas has also launched 122-mm Grad-type Katyusha rockets  against several cities in Israel, although they are not reported to have truck-mounted launchers. Although Katyusha originally referred to the mobile launcher, today the rockets are often referred to as Katyushas.

Some allege that the Central Intelligence Agency bought Katyushas from the Egyptian Armed Forces and supplied them to the Mujahideen (via Pakistan's ISI) during the Soviet–Afghan War.<ref name=crile>Charlie Wilson's War: The Extraordinary Story of the Largest Covert Operation in History, George Crile, 2003, Grove/Atlantic.</ref>

Katyusha-like MRLs were also allegedly used by the Rwandan Patriotic Front during its 1990 invasion of Rwanda, through the 1994 genocide. They were effective in battle, but translated into much anti-Tutsi sentiment in the local media.

It was reported that BM-21 Grad launchers were used against the U.S. Army during the 2003 invasion of Iraq. They have also been used in the Afghanistan and Iraq insurgencies. In Iraq, according to Associated Press and Agence France-Presse reports, Katyusha-like rockets were fired at the Green Zone late March 2008.

Katyusha rockets were reportedly used by both Gaddafi Loyalists and anti-Gaddafi forces during the Libyan Civil War.

In February 2013, the Defence Ministry of Yemen reported seizing an Iranian ship, and that the ship's cargo included (among its other weapons) Katyusha rockets.

On May 19, 2019, a Katyusha rocket was fired inside the Green Zone in Baghdad, Iraq, landing less than a mile from the US Embassy near the statue of the Unknown Soldier. No casualties were reported.

On January 4, 2020, four Katyusha rockets were fired in the Baghdad area. According to two Iraqi Police sources and an official Iraqi Armed Forces statement, one Katyusha rocket landed in the Green Zone in Celebration Square near the U.S. Embassy and another landed in the nearby Jadriya neighborhood. Two other Katyusha rockets landed in Balad Air Base, which houses U.S. Armed Forces troops, according to two security sources.

Recognition and honours 
Participants in the creation of the Katyusha rocket launcher received official recognition only in 1991. By decree of the President of the USSR Mikhail Gorbachev dated June 21, 1991, I. T. Kleymenov, G. E. Langemak, V. N. Luzhin, B. S. Petropavlovsky, B. M. Slonimer and N. I. Tikhomirov were posthumously awarded title of Heroes of Socialist Labor for their work on the creation of the Katyusha.

See also 
 Congreve rocket, British military weapon designed by Sir William Congreve in 1804
 Hwacha, Korean gunpowder-based flaming arrow launcher from the 1500s
 Land Mattress, employed by Allied forces in World War II
 List of rocket artillery
 Nebelwerfer, the most common barrage rocket series employed by the Wehrmacht in World War II
 Panzerwerfer, German rocket launcher mounted on a half-track
 Reactive Scientific Research Institute where the Katyusha rocket launcher was created
 T34 Calliope, rocket launcher mounted on M-4 Sherman tank chassis. Last vehicle-mounted highly-mobile multiple-rocket launcher by US land forces before abandoning this concept until renewed interest in the mid-1980s.
 Wurfrahmen 40, another German rocket launcher mounted on a half-track

References

Citations

General bibliography

Further reading
 Prenatt, Jamie and Hook, Adam (2016). Katyusha: Russian Multiple Rocket Launchers 1941–Present, Oxford: Osprey Publishing Ltd.

External links 

 Photos of various mounts of Katyushas
 "Creation and Development of Rocket Artillery in the First Phase of the War", translation of a 1976 article published by the USSR Defence Ministry (broken link, see archive)
 Photo of a Cuban BM-21 in Angola

Multiple rocket launchers of the Soviet Union
Self-propelled artillery of the Soviet Union
World War II self-propelled artillery
Wheeled self-propelled rocket launchers
World War II artillery of the Soviet Union
Soviet inventions
Military vehicles introduced from 1940 to 1944